Robert Dunn (born 28 June 1979) is a Scottish former footballer who played for Partick Thistle, Airdrie, Dumbarton, Stirling Albion, St Mirren and Queen's Park.

Honours
Airdrieonians
Scottish Challenge Cup: 2001–02

References

External links
 

1979 births
Scottish footballers
Dumbarton F.C. players
Partick Thistle F.C. players
Stirling Albion F.C. players
Airdrieonians F.C. (1878) players
St Mirren F.C. players
Queen's Park F.C. players
Scottish Football League players
Living people
Association football forwards
Association football midfielders